Eddie Allen may refer to:
 Eddie Allen (fullback) (1918–2012), American football player and coach
 Eddie Allen (American football coach), American football coach and player
 Eddie Allen (folk musician), American folk musician
 Eddie Allen (jazz musician) (born 1957), American jazz trumpeter and flugelhornist
 Ed Allen (musician) (1897–1974), American jazz trumpeter
 Edmund T. Allen (1896–1943), American test pilot

See also
 Edmund Allen (disambiguation) 
 Edward Allen (disambiguation)
 
 Allen (surname)